Prince Edward Island (PEI; ; colloquially known as The Island) is one of the thirteen provinces and territories of Canada. It is the smallest province in terms of land area and population, but the most densely populated. The island has several nicknames: "Garden of the Gulf", "Birthplace of Confederation" and "Cradle of Confederation". Its capital and largest city is Charlottetown. It is one of the three Maritime provinces and one of the four Atlantic provinces.

Part of the traditional lands of the Miꞌkmaq, it was colonized by the French in 1604 as part of the colony of Acadia. The island was ceded to the British at the conclusion of the French and Indian War in 1763 and became part of the colony of Nova Scotia, and in 1769 the island became its own British colony. Prince Edward Island hosted the Charlottetown Conference in 1864 to discuss a union of the Maritime provinces; however, the conference became the first in a series of meetings which led to Canadian Confederation in 1867. Prince Edward Island initially balked at Confederation but, facing bankruptcy from the Land Question and construction of a railroad, joined as Canada's seventh province in 1873.

According to Statistics Canada, the province of Prince Edward Island had 158,717 residents in 2019. The backbone of the island economy is farming; it produces 25% of Canada's potatoes. Other important industries include the fisheries, tourism, aerospace, bio-science, IT, and renewable energy. As Prince Edward Island is one of Canada's older settlements, its population still reflects some of the earliest settlers, with Canadien, Scottish, Irish, and English surnames being dominant.

It is the 104th-largest island in the world, Canada's 23rd-largest island, and the only Canadian province consisting solely of an island.

Etymology
The island is known in the Mi'kmaq language of its historic indigenous occupants as Abegweit or Epekwitk, roughly translated as "land cradled in the waves".

When the island was part of Acadia, originally settled by French colonists, its French name was Île Saint-Jean (St. John's Island). In French, the island is today called Île-du-Prince-Édouard.

As a result of the early French colonial name, Scots immigrants knew the island in Scottish Gaelic as Eilean a' Phrionnsa (lit. "the Island of the Prince", the local form of the longer 'Eilean a' Phrionnsa Iomhair/Eideard') or Eilean Eòin for some Gaelic speakers in Nova Scotia, though not on PEI (literally, "John's Island" in reference to the island's former French name).

The island was split from the British colony of Nova Scotia in 1769, and renamed in 1798 after Prince Edward, Duke of Kent and Strathearn (1767–1820), the fourth son of King George III and, in 1819, father of the future Queen Victoria. Thus, Prince Edward has been called "Father of the Canadian Crown". The following island landmarks are also named after the Duke of Kent:

 Prince Edward Battery, Victoria Park, Charlottetown
 Kent College, established in 1804 by Lieutenant Governor Edmund Fanning and his Legislative Council, the college would eventually become the University of Prince Edward Island
 Kent Street, Charlottetown
 West Kent Elementary School
 Kent Street, Georgetown

Geography

Prince Edward Island is located in the Gulf of St. Lawrence, west of Cape Breton Island, north of the Nova Scotia peninsula, and east of New Brunswick. Its southern shore bounds the Northumberland Strait. The island has two urban areas, and in total, is the most densely populated province in Canada.

The larger urban area surrounds Charlottetown Harbour, situated centrally on the island's southern shore. It consists of the capital city Charlottetown, and suburban towns Cornwall and Stratford and a developing urban fringe. This consists primarily of the city of Summerside. As with all natural harbours on the island, Charlottetown and Summerside harbours are created by rias.

The coastline has a combination of long beaches, dunes, red sandstone cliffs, salt water marshes, and numerous bays and harbours. The beaches, dunes and sandstone cliffs consist of sedimentary rock and other material with a high iron concentration, which oxidises upon exposure to the air. The geological properties of a white silica sand found at Basin Head are unique in the province; the sand grains cause a scrubbing noise as they rub against each other when walked on, and have been called the "singing sands". Large dune fields on the north shore can be found on barrier islands at the entrances to various bays and harbours. The sand dunes at Greenwich are of particular significance. The shifting, parabolic dune system is home to a variety of birds and rare plants; it is also a site of significant archeological interest.

Climate
The climate of the island is a maritime climate considered to be moderate and strongly influenced by the surrounding seas. As such, it is milder than inland locations owing to the warm waters from the Gulf of St. Lawrence. The climate is characterized by changeable weather throughout the year; it has some of the most variable day-to-day weather in Canada, in which specific weather conditions seldom last for long.

Winters are moderately cold and long but are milder than inland locations, with clashes of cold Arctic air and milder Atlantic air causing frequent temperature swings. The climate is considered to be more humid continental climate than oceanic since the Gulf of St. Lawrence freezes over, thus eliminating any moderation. During the winter months, the island usually has many storms (which may produce rain as well as snow) and blizzards since during this time, storms originating from the North Atlantic or the Gulf of Mexico frequently pass through. Springtime temperatures typically remain cool until the sea ice has melted, usually in late April or early May.

Autumn is a pleasant season, as the moderating Gulf waters delay the onset of frost, although storm activity increases compared to the summer. There is ample precipitation throughout the year, although it is heaviest in the late autumn, early winter and mid spring.

The following climate chart depicts the average conditions of Charlottetown, as an example of the province's climate.

Geology

Between 250 and 300 million years ago, freshwater streams flowing from ancient mountains brought silt, sand and gravel into what is now the Gulf of St. Lawrence. These sediments accumulated to form a sedimentary basin, and make up the island's bedrock. When the Pleistocene glaciers receded about 15,000 years ago, glacial debris such as till were left behind to cover most of the area that would become the island. This area was connected to the mainland by a strip of land, but when ocean levels rose as the glaciers melted, this land strip was flooded, forming the island. As the land rebounded from the weight of the ice, the island rose up to elevate it farther from the surrounding water.

Most of the bedrock in Prince Edward Island is composed of red sandstone, part of the Permian age Pictou Group.

Although commercial deposits of minerals have not been found, exploration in the 1940s for natural gas beneath the northeastern end of the province resulted in the discovery of an undisclosed quantity of gas. The Island was reported by government to have only 0.08 tcf of "technically recoverable" natural gas. Twenty exploration wells for hydrocarbon resources have been drilled on Prince Edward Island and offshore. The first reported well was Hillsborough No.#1, drilled in Charlottetown Harbour in 1944 (the world's first offshore well), and the most recent was New Harmony No.#1 in 2007. Since the resurgence of exploration in the mid-1990s, all wells that have shown promising gas deposits have been stimulated through hydraulic fracture or "fracking". All oil and natural gas exploration and exploitation activities on the Island are governed by the Oil and Natural Gas Act R.S.P.E.I. 1988, Cap. 0-5 and its associated regulations and orders.

Water supply
The Province of Prince Edward Island is completely dependent on groundwater for its source of drinking water, with approximately 305 high capacity wells in use as of December 2018. As groundwater flows through an aquifer, it is naturally filtered. The water for the city of Charlottetown is extracted from thirteen wells in three wellfields and distributed to customers. The water removed is replenished by precipitation.

Infrastructure in Charlottetown that was installed in 1888 is still in existence. With the age of the system in the older part of Charlottetown, concern has been raised regarding lead pipes. The Utility has been working with its residents on a lead-replacement program. A plebiscite in 1967 was held in Charlottetown over fluoridation, and residents voted in favour. Under provincial legislation, the Utility is required to report to its residents on an annual basis. It is also required to do regular sampling of the water and an overview is included in each annual report. The Winter River watershed provides about 92 per cent of the  water supply for the city of Charlottetown, which had difficulty in each of 2011, 2012 and 2013 with its supply, until water meters were installed.

Government tabled a discussion paper on the proposed Water Act for the province on July 8, 2015. The use of groundwater came under scrutiny as the potato industry, which accounts for $1 billion every year and 50% of farm receipts, has pressed the government to lift a moratorium on high-capacity water wells for irrigation. The release of the discussion paper was to set off a consultation process in the autumn of 2015.

Detailed information about the quality of drinking water in PEI communities and watersheds can be found on the provincial government's official website. It provides a summary of the ongoing testing of drinking water done by the Prince Edward Island Analytical Laboratories. Average drinking-water quality results are available, and information on the following parameters are provided: alkalinity; cadmium; calcium; chloride; chromium; iron; magnesium; manganese; nickel; nitrate; pH; phosphorus; potassium; sodium; and sulfate, as well as the presence of pesticides. Water-testing services are provided for a variety of clients through the PEI Analytical Laboratories which assesses according to the recommendations of the Guidelines for Canadian Drinking Water Quality published by Health Canada.

Flora and fauna
Prince Edward Island used to have native moose, bear, caribou, wolf, and other larger species. Due to hunting and habitat disruption these species are no longer found on the island. Some species common to P.E.I. are red foxes, coyote, blue jays, and robins. Skunks and raccoons are common non-native species. Species at risk in P.E.I. include piping plovers, american eel, bobolinks, little brown bat, and beach pinweed.

Some species are unique to the province. In 2008, a new ascomycete species, Jahnula apiospora (Jahnulales, Dothideomycetes), was collected from submerged wood in a freshwater creek on Prince Edward Island.

North Atlantic right whales, one of the rarest whale species, were once thought to be rare visitors into St. Lawrence regions until 1994, have been showing dramatic increases (annual concentrations were discovered off Percé in 1995 and gradual increases across the regions since in 1998), and since in 2014, notable numbers of whales have been recorded around Cape Breton to Prince Edward Island as 35 to 40 whales were seen in these areas in 2015.

History

Before the influx of Europeans, the Mi'kmaq First Nations have inhabited Prince Edward Island as part of the region of Mi'kma'ki. They named the Island Epekwitk, meaning 'cradled on the waves'; Europeans represented the pronunciation as Abegweit. Another name is Minegoo. The Mi'kmaq's legend is that the island was formed by the Great Spirit placing on the Blue Waters some dark red crescent-shaped clay. There are two Mi'kmaq First Nation communities today.

French colony
In 1534, Jacques Cartier was the first European to see the island. In 1604, the Kingdom of France laid claim to the lands of the Maritimes under the discovery doctrine, including Prince Edward Island, establishing the French colony of Acadia. The island was named Île Saint-Jean (St. John's Island) by the French. The Mi'kmaq never recognized the claim but welcomed the French as trading partners and allies.

During the 18th century, the French were engaged in a series of conflicts with the Kingdom of Great Britain and its colonies. Several battles between the two belligerents occurred on Prince Edward Island during this period. Following the British capture of Louisbourg during the War of the Austrian Succession, New Englanders launched an attack on Île Saint-Jean (now Prince Edward Island); with a British detachment landed at Port-la-Joye. The island's capital had a garrison of 20 French soldiers under the command of Joseph du Pont Duvivier. The troops fled the settlement, and the New Englanders burned the settlement to the ground. Duvivier and the twenty men retreated up the Northeast River (Hillsborough River), pursued by the New Englanders until the French troops were reinforced with the arrival of the Acadian militia and the Mi'kmaq. The French troops and their allies were able to drive the New Englanders to their boats. Nine New Englanders were killed, wounded or made prisoner. The New Englanders took six Acadian hostages, who would be executed if the Acadians or Mi'kmaq rebelled against New England control. The New England troops left for Louisbourg. Duvivier and his 20 troops left for Quebec. After the fall of Louisbourg, the resident French population of Île Royale (now Cape Breton Island) were deported to France, with the remaining Acadians of Île Saint-Jean living under the threat of deportation for the remainder of the war.

New Englanders had a force of 200 soldiers stationed at Port-La-Joye, as well as two warships boarding supplies for its journey of Louisbourg. To regain Acadia, Ramezay was sent from Quebec to the region to join forces with the Duc d'Anville expedition. Upon arriving at Chignecto, he sent Boishebert to Île Saint-Jean to ascertain the size of the New England force. After Boishebert returned, Ramezay sent Joseph-Michel Legardeur de Croisille et de Montesson along with over 500 men, 200 of whom were Mi'kmaq, to Port-La-Joye. In July 1746, the battle happened near York River. Montesson and his troops killed forty New Englanders and captured the rest. Montesson was commended for having distinguished himself in his first independent command. Hostilities between the British and French were ended in 1748 with the Treaty of Aix-la-Chapelle in 1748.

Roughly one thousand Acadians lived on the island prior to the Acadian Exodus from Nova Scotia. The population grew to nearly 5,000 the late 1740s and early 1750s, as Acadians from Nova Scotia fled to the island during the Acadian Exodus, and the subsequent British-ordered expulsions beginning in 1755.

Hostilities between British and French colonial forces resumed in 1754, although formal declarations of war were not issued until 1756. After French forces were defeated at the siege of Louisbourg, the British performed a military campaign on Ile Saint-Jean (now Prince Edward Island) to secure the island. The campaign was led by Colonel Andrew Rollo under orders from General Jeffery Amherst. The following campaigns saw the deportation of most Acadians from the island. Many Acadians died in the expulsion en route to France; on December 13, 1758, the transport ship Duke William sank and 364 died. A day earlier the Violet sank and 280 died; several days later  sank with 213 on board. The French formally ceded the island, and most of New France to the British in the Treaty of Paris of 1763.

British colony
Initially named St. John's Island by the British, the island was administered as part of the colony of Nova Scotia, until it was split into a separate colony in 1769. In the mid-1760s, a survey team led by Samuel Holland divided the Island into 67 lots. On July 1, 1767, these properties were allocated to supporters of King George III by means of a lottery. Ownership of the land remained in the hands of landlords in England, angering Island settlers who were unable to gain title to land on which they worked and lived. Significant rent charges (to absentee landlords) created further anger. The land had been given to the absentee landlords with a number of conditions attached regarding upkeep and settlement terms, many of which were not satisfied. Islanders spent decades trying to convince the Crown to confiscate the lots; however, the descendants of the original owners were generally well connected to the British government and refused to give up the land.

After the island was detached from Nova Scotia to become a separate colony, Walter Patterson was appointed the first British governor of St. John's Island in 1769. Assuming the office in 1770, he had a controversial career during which land title disputes and factional conflict slowed the initial attempts to populate and develop the island under a feudal system. In an attempt to attract settlers from Ireland, in one of his first acts (1770) Patterson led the island's colonial assembly to rename the island "New Ireland", but the British Government promptly vetoed this as it exceeded the authority vested in the colonial government; only the Privy Council in London could change the name of a colony.

During the American Revolutionary War Charlottetown was raided in 1775 by a pair of American-employed privateers. Two armed schooners, Franklin and Hancock, from Beverly, Massachusetts, made prisoner of the attorney-general at Charlottetown, on advice given them by some Pictou residents after they had taken eight fishing vessels in the Gut of Canso.

During and after the American Revolutionary War, from 1776 to 1783, the colony's efforts to attract exiled Loyalist refugees from the rebellious American colonies met with some success. Walter Patterson's brother, John Patterson, one of the original grantees of land on the island, was a temporarily exiled Loyalist and led efforts to persuade others to come. Governor Patterson dismissal in 1787, and his recall to London in 1789 dampened his brother's efforts, leading John to focus on his interests in the United States. Edmund Fanning, also a Loyalist exiled by the Revolution, took over as the second governor, serving until 1804. His tenure was more successful than Patterson's. A large influx of Scottish Highlanders in the late 1700s also resulted in St. John's Island having the highest proportion of Scottish immigrants in Canada. This led to a higher proportion of Scottish Gaelic speakers and thriving culture surviving on the island than in Scotland itself, as the settlers could more easily avoid English influence overseas.

On 29 November 1798, during Fanning's administration, the British government granted approval to change the colony's name from St. John's Island to Prince Edward Island to distinguish it from areas with similar names in what is now Atlantic Canada, such as the cities of Saint John in New Brunswick and St. John's in Newfoundland. The colony's new name honoured the fourth son of King George III, Prince Edward Augustus, the Duke of Kent (1767–1820), who subsequently led the British military forces on the continent as Commander-in-Chief, North America (1799–1800), with his headquarters in Halifax.

In 1853, the Island government passed the Land Purchase Act which empowered them to purchase lands from those owners who were willing to sell, and then resell the land to settlers for low prices. This scheme collapsed when the Island ran short of money to continue with the purchases. Many of these lands also were fertile, and were some of the key factors to sustaining Prince Edward Island's economy.

Confederation

In September 1864, Prince Edward Island hosted the Charlottetown Conference, which was the first meeting in the process leading to the Quebec Resolutions and the creation of Canada in 1867. Prince Edward Island found the terms of union unfavourable and balked at joining in 1867, choosing to remain a colony of the United Kingdom. In the late 1860s, the colony examined various options, including the possibility of becoming a discrete dominion unto itself, as well as entertaining delegations from the United States, who were interested in Prince Edward Island joining the United States.

In 1871, the colony began construction of the Prince Edward Island Railway (PEIR) and, frustrated by Great Britain's Colonial Office, began negotiations with the United States. In 1873, Canadian Prime Minister John A. Macdonald, anxious to thwart American expansionism and facing the distraction of the Pacific Scandal, negotiated for Prince Edward Island to join Canada. The Dominion Government of Canada assumed the colony's extensive railway debts and agreed to finance a buy-out of the last of the colony's absentee landlords to free the island of leasehold tenure and from any new immigrants entering the island (accomplished through the passage of the Land Purchase Act, 1875). Prince Edward Island entered Confederation on July 1, 1873.

As a result of having hosted the inaugural meeting of Confederation, the Charlottetown Conference, Prince Edward Island presents itself as the "Birthplace of Confederation" and this is commemorated through several buildings, a ferry vessel, and the Confederation Bridge (constructed 1993 to 1997). The most prominent building in the province honouring this event is the Confederation Centre of the Arts, presented as a gift to Prince Edward Islanders by the 10 provincial governments and the Federal Government upon the centenary of the Charlottetown Conference, where it stands in Charlottetown as a national monument to the "Fathers of Confederation". The centre is one of the 22 National Historic Sites of Canada located in Prince Edward Island.

Demographics

Ethnicity 

According to the 2016 Canadian Census of the 139,690	people who self-identified with an ethnic origin, 98,615 were of European origins and 85,145 chose British Isles Origins. The largest ethnic group consists of people of Scottish descent (36%), followed by English (29%), Irish (28%), French (21%), German (5%), and Dutch (3%) descent.
Prince Edward Island's population is largely white; there are few visible minorities. Chinese Canadians are the largest visible minority group of Prince Edward Island, comprising 1.3% of the province's population. Almost half of respondents identified their ethnicity as "Canadian".

Source: Statistics Canada

Language 

As of the 2021 Canadian Census, the ten most spoken languages in the province included English (149,525 or 99.36%), French (19,445 or 12.92%), Mandarin (2,940 or 1.95%), Hindi (1,660 or 1.1%), Tagalog (1,630 or 1.08%), Punjabi (1,550 or 1.03%), Spanish (1,425 or 0.95%), Arabic (1,165 or 0.77%), German (1,040 or 0.69%), and Vietnamese (785 or 0.52%). The question on knowledge of languages allows for multiple responses.

The Canada 2016 Census showed a population of 142,910. Of the 140,020 singular responses to the census question concerning mother tongue, the most commonly reported languages were as follows:

In addition, there were 460 responses of both English and a "non-official language"; 30 of both French and a "non-official language"; 485 of both English and French; and 20 of English, French, and a "non-official language". (Figures shown are for the number of single language responses and the percentage of total single-language responses.)

Religion 

According to the 2021 census, religious groups in Prince Edward Island included:
Christianity (101,755 persons or 67.6%)
Irreligion (42,830 persons or 28.5%)
Islam (1,720 persons or 1.1%)
Hinduism (1,245 persons or 0.8%)
Sikhism (1,165 persons or 0.8%)
Buddhism (755 persons or 0.5%)
Judaism (165 persons or 0.1%)
Indigenous Spirituality (75 persons or <0.1%)
Other (765 persons or 0.5%)

Traditionally, the population has been evenly divided between Catholic and Protestant affiliations. The 2001 census indicated number of adherents for the Roman Catholic Church with 63,240 (47%) and various Protestant churches with 57,805 (43%). This included the United Church of Canada with 26,570 (20%); the Presbyterian Church with 7,885 (6%) and the Anglican Church of Canada with 6,525 (5%); those with no religion were among the lowest of the provinces with 8,705 (6.5%). If one considers that the founders of the United Church of Canada were largely Presbyterians in Prince Edward Island, the Island has one of the highest percentages of Presbyterians in the country. Since 2016 there are two Amish settlements on Prince Edward Island.

Economy
The provincial economy is dominated by the seasonal industries of agriculture, tourism, and the fishery. The island also has tourists who visit year-round. with tourists enjoying a variety of leisure activities, including the beaches, various golf courses, eco-tourism adventures, touring the countryside, and varied cultural events in local communities around the island. The economy of most rural communities on the island is based on small-scale agriculture. Industrial farming has increased as businesses buy and consolidate older farm properties. The province is limited in terms of heavy industry and manufacturing, though Cavendish Farms runs extensive food manufacturing operations on PEI. 

Agriculture remains the dominant industry in the provincial economy, as it has since colonial times. In 2015, agriculture and agri-food manufacturing was responsible for 7.6% of the province's GDP. In 2016, the Census of Agriculture counted 1,353 farms on the Island, which is a 9.5% decrease from the previous census (2011). During the 20th century, potatoes replaced mixed farming as the leading cash crop, accounting for one-third of provincial farm income. The number of acres under potato production in 2010 was 88,000, while soy accounted for 55,000. There are approximately 330 potato growers on PEI, with the grand majority of these being family farms, often with multiple generations working together. The province currently accounts for a third of Canada's total potato production, producing approximately  annually. Comparatively, the state of Idaho produces approximately  annually, with a population approximately 9.5 times greater. The province is a major producer of seed potatoes, exporting to more than twenty countries around the world. An estimated total of 70% of the land is cultivated and 25% of all potatoes grown in Canada originate from P.E.I. The processing of frozen fried potatoes, green vegetables, and berries is a leading business activity.

As a legacy of the island's colonial history, the provincial government enforces extremely strict rules for non-resident land ownership, especially since the PEI Lands Protection Act of 1982. Residents and corporations are limited to maximum holdings of 400 and 1,200 hectares respectively. There are also restrictions on non-resident ownership of shorelines.

Many of the province's coastal communities rely upon shellfish harvesting, particularly lobster fishing as well as oyster fishing and mussel farming.

The island's economy has grown significantly over the last decade in key areas of innovation. Aerospace, bioscience, information and communications technology, and renewable energy have been a focus for growth and diversification. Aerospace alone now accounts for over 25% of the province's international exports and is the island's fourth largest industry at $355 million in annual sales. The bioscience industry employs over 1,300 people and generates over $150 million in sales.

The sale of carbonated beverages such as beer and soft drinks in non-refillable containers, such as aluminum cans or plastic bottles, was banned in 1976 as an environmental measure in response to public concerns over litter. Beer and soft drink companies opted to use refillable glass bottles for their products which were redeemable at stores and bottle depots.

Though often environmental and economic agendas may be at odds, the ‘ban the can’ legislation, along with being environmentally driven, was also economically motivated as it protected jobs. Seaman's Beverages, a bottling company and carbonated beverage manufacturer, was established in 1939 and a major employer in Charlottetown, Prince Edward Island. Making it illegal to retail cans led to a bigger share of the carbonated beverage market for Seamans. Seamans Beverages was eventually acquired by Pepsi Bottling Group Inc in 2002 prior to the lifting of the legislation.

The introduction of recycling programs for cans and plastic bottles in neighbouring provinces in recent years (also using a redemption system) has seen the provincial government introduce legislation to reverse this ban with the restriction lifted on May 3, 2008.

Prior to harmonization in 2013, Prince Edward Island had one of Canada's highest provincial retail sales tax rates at 10%. On April 1, 2013, the provincial tax was harmonized with the federal Goods and Services Tax, and became known as the harmonized sales tax. The 15% tax is applied to almost all goods and services except some clothing, food and home heating fuel. This rate is the same as the neighbouring Atlantic provinces.

The provincial government provides consumer protection in the form of regulation for certain items, ranging from apartment rent increases to petroleum products including gas, diesel, propane and heating oil. These are regulated through the Prince Edward Island Regulatory and Appeals Commission (IRAC). IRAC is authorized to limit the number of companies who are permitted to sell petroleum products.

, the median family income on Prince Edward Island is $76,607/year. The minimum wage is $12.85/hour .

Energy

Since 1918 Maritime Electric has delivered electricity to customers on the Island. The utility is currently owned and operated by Fortis Inc. Approximately twenty-five percent of electricity consumed on the island is generated from renewable energy (largely wind turbines); the provincial government had set a renewable energy target for 30-50% for electricity consumed by 2015, though this goal has not been met. The total capacity of wind power on the island is 204 MW from 89 turbines. There are eight wind farms on the island, the largest being West Cape Wind Park with a capacity of 99 MW from 55 turbines. All of the turbines have been manufactured by Vestas: the Vestas V-80, Vestas V90, and Vestas V-47. A thermal oil-fired generating station, the Charlottetown Thermal Generating Station, is used sometimes for emergencies. It is being decommissioned. A second thermal generation station exists in Borden, the Borden Generating Station. The majority of electricity consumed on Prince Edward Island comes from New Brunswick through undersea cables. A recent $140M upgrade brought the capacity of the cable system from 200 MW to 560 MW.

The Point Lepreau nuclear plant in New Brunswick was closed for refurbishments from 2008 to 2012, resulting in a steep price hike of about 25 per cent, but the province later subsidized rates. Residents were to pay 11.2 per cent more for electricity when the harmonized sales tax was adopted in April 2013, according to the P.E.I. Energy Accord that was tabled in the legislature on December 7, 2012. and passed as the Electric Power (Energy Accord Continuation) Amendment Act, which establishes electric pricing from April 1, 2013, to March 1, 2016. Regulatory powers are derived for IRAC from the Electric Power Act.

Education
Prince Edward Island's public school system has an English school district named the Public Schools Branch (previously the English Language School Board), as well as a Francophone district, the Commission scolaire de langue française. The English language district has a total of 10 secondary schools and 54 intermediate and elementary schools while the Francophone district has 6 schools covering all grades. 22 per cent of the student population is enrolled in French immersion. This is one of the highest levels in the country.

Three public post-secondary institutions operate in the province, including one university, and two colleges. The University of Prince Edward Island is the province's only public university, and is located in the city of Charlottetown. The university was created by the Island legislature to replace Prince of Wales College and St. Dunstan's University. UPEI is also home to the Atlantic Veterinary College, which offers the region's only veterinary medicine program.

Collège de l'Île, and Holland College are two public colleges that operate in the province; the former being a French first language institution, while the latter was an English first language institution. Holland College included specialised facilities such as the Atlantic Police Academy, Marine Training Centre, and the Culinary Institute of Canada. In addition to public post-secondary institutions, Prince Edward Island is also home to a private post-secondary institution, Maritime Christian College.

Today 23.5 per cent of residents aged 15 to 19 have bilingual skills, an increase of 100 per cent in a decade. Prince Edward Island, along with most rural regions in North America, is experiencing an accelerated rate of youth emigration. The provincial government has projected that public school enrollment will decline by 40% during the 2010s.

Government and politics

The provincial government is responsible for such areas as health and social services, education, economic development, labour legislation and civil law. These matters of government are overseen in the provincial capital, Charlottetown.

Prince Edward Island is governed by a parliamentary government within the construct of constitutional monarchy; the monarchy in Prince Edward Island is the foundation of the executive, legislative, and judicial branches. The sovereign is King Charles III, who also serves as head of state of 14 other Commonwealth countries, each of Canada's nine other provinces, and the Canadian federal realm, and resides predominantly in the United Kingdom. As such, the King's representative, the Lieutenant Governor of Prince Edward Island (presently Antoinette Perry), carries out most of the royal duties in Prince Edward Island.

The direct participation of the royal and viceroyal figures in any of these areas of governance is limited; in practice, their use of the executive powers is directed by the Executive Council, a committee of ministers of the Crown responsible to the unicameral, elected Legislative Assembly and chosen and headed by the Premier of Prince Edward Island (presently Dennis King), the head of government. To ensure the stability of government, the lieutenant governor will usually appoint as premier the person who is the current leader of the political party that can obtain the confidence of a plurality in the Legislative Assembly. The leader of the party with the second-most seats usually becomes the Leader of His Majesty's Loyal Opposition (presently Peter Bevan-Baker) and is part of an adversarial parliamentary system intended to keep the government in check.

Each of the 27 Members of the Legislative Assembly (MLA) is elected by simple plurality in an electoral district. General elections are called by the lieutenant governor for the first Monday in October four years after the previous election, or may be called earlier on the advice of the premier. Historically, politics in the province have been dominated by the Liberal and the Progressive Conservative Parties since the province joined Confederation. From the 2015 election, the Green Party of Prince Edward Island gained a small representation in the Legislative Assembly, and in the 2019 election gained an additional six seats to form the Official Opposition.

The Mi'kmaq Confederacy of PEI is the tribal council and provincial-territorial organization in the province that represents both the Lennox Island and Abegweit First Nations.

Administrative divisions

Prince Edward Island is divided into three counties that have historically been used as administrative divisions for the provincial government, and prior to Confederation (in 1873), the colonial government.

Today, the counties are no longer used as administrative boundaries for the provincial government, though they continue to be used as census divisions by Statistics Canada for statistical purposes in administering the Canadian census.

Municipalities

Zoning
The island's landscape is pastoral. Rolling hills, woods, reddish white sand beaches, ocean coves and the famous red soil have given Prince Edward Island a reputation as a province of outstanding natural beauty. As a result, the provincial government has enacted laws to preserve the landscape through regulation, although there is a lack of consistent enforcement.

There is no province-wide zoning and land-use planning. Under the Planning Act of the province, municipalities have the option to assume responsibility for land-use planning through the development and adoption of official plans and land use bylaws. Thirty-one municipalities have taken responsibility for planning. In areas where municipalities have not assumed responsibility for planning, the Province remains responsible for development control.

Health care and sanitation

The province has a single health administrative region (or district health authority) called Health PEI. Health PEI receives funding for its operations and is regulated by the Department of Health and Wellness.

Many PEI homes and businesses are served by central sewage collection and/or treatment systems. These are operated either by a municipality or a private utility. Many industrial operations have their own wastewater treatment facilities. Staff members with the Department of Environment, Water and Climate Change provide advice to operators, as needed, on proper system maintenance. The IRAC regulates municipal water and sewer in the province, now under the Environmental Protection Act. Since around 1900, the residents of the City of Charlottetown have benefited from a central sanitary sewer service. Early disposal practices, while advanced for their time, eventually were found to compromise the ecological integrity of the nearby Hillsborough River and the Charlottetown Harbour. By 1974, the commission had spearheaded the development of a primary wastewater treatment plant, known as the Charlottetown Pollution Control Plant, together with the construction of several pumping stations along the city's waterfront, and outfall piping deep into the Hillsborough River.

There are eight hospitals in the province.

Queen Elizabeth Hospital (Charlottetown)
Prince County Hospital (Summerside)
Kings County Memorial Hospital (Montague)
Community Hospital (O'Leary)
Souris Hospital (Souris)
Western Hospital (Alberton)
 Hillsborough Hospital (Charlottetown) - the province's only psychiatric hospital

Prince Edward Island offers programs and services in areas such as acute care, primary care, home care, palliative care, public health, chronic disease prevention, and mental health and addictions, to name a few. The provincial government has opened several family health centres in recent years in various rural and urban communities. A provincial cancer treatment centre at the Queen Elizabeth Hospital provides support to those dealing with various types of cancer-related illnesses. A family medicine residency program was established in 2009 with the Dalhousie University Faculty of Medicine as a means to encourage new physicians to work in Prince Edward Island.

Long-term-care services are also available with several programs in place to support seniors wishing to remain independent in their communities. Many medications for seniors are subsidized through a provincial pharmaceutical plan.

The provincial government has several programs for early illness detection, including mammography and pap screening clinics. There are also asthma education and diabetes education programs, as well as prenatal programs, immunization programs and dental health risk prevention programs for children. The government is also attempting to implement a comprehensive integrated Electronic Health Record system.

The provincial government has recently committed to enhancing primary care and home care services and has invested in health care facilities in recent capital budgets; mostly replacements and upgrades to provincial government operated nursing homes and hospitals.

Some specialist services require patients to be referred to clinics and specialists in neighbouring provinces. Specialist operations and treatments are also provided at larger tertiary referral hospitals in neighbouring provinces such as the IWK Health Centre and Queen Elizabeth II Health Sciences Centre in Nova Scotia or the Saint John Regional Hospital, Moncton Hospital, and Dr. Georges-L.-Dumont University Hospital Centre in New Brunswick.

Ground ambulance service in Prince Edward Island is provided under contract by Island EMS. Air ambulance service is provided under contract by LifeFlight.

In recent decades, Prince Edward Island's population has shown statistically significant and abnormally high rates of diagnosed rare cancers, particularly in rural areas. Health officials, ecologists and environmental activists point to the use of pesticides for industrial potato farming as a primary contaminant.

Until 2016, Prince Edward Island was the only province in Canada that did not provide abortion services through its hospitals. Until that time, the last abortion that had been performed in the province was in 1982 prior to the opening of the Queen Elizabeth Hospital which saw the closure of the Roman Catholic-affiliated Charlottetown Hospital and the non-denominational Prince Edward Island Hospital; a condition of the "merger" being that abortions not be performed in the province. In 1988, following the court decision R. v. Morgentaler, the then-opposition Progressive Conservative Party of Prince Edward Island tabled a motion demanding that the ban on abortions be upheld at the province's hospitals; the then-governing Prince Edward Island Liberal Party under Premier Joe Ghiz acquiesced and the ban was upheld. Until more local access was guaranteed, the Government of Prince Edward Island funded abortions for women who travelled to another province. Women from Prince Edward Island also travelled to the nearest private user-pay clinic, where they were required pay for the procedure using their own funds. Formerly this was the Morgentaler Clinic in Fredericton, New Brunswick until this clinic closed due to lack of funds in July 2014. The clinic was reopened under new ownership in 2016 as Clinic 554 with expanded services. During that gap, women had to travel to Halifax or further. In 2016, the Liberal government led by Premier Wade MacLauchlan announced they would open a women's reproductive health clinic to provide abortions within the province. Abortions are now provided in Prince Edward Island.

Transportation
Prince Edward Island's transportation network has traditionally revolved around its seaports of Charlottetown, Summerside, Borden, Georgetown, and Souris —linked to its railway system, and the two main airports in Charlottetown and Summerside, for communication with mainland North America. The railway system was abandoned by CN in 1989 in favour of an agreement with the federal government to improve major highways.

Until May 1997, the province was linked by two passenger-vehicle ferry services to the mainland: one, provided by Marine Atlantic, operated year-round between Borden and Cape Tormentine, New Brunswick; the other, provided by Northumberland Ferries Limited, operates seasonally between Wood Islands and Caribou, Nova Scotia. A third ferry service provided by CTMA operates all year round with seasonal times between Souris and Cap-aux-Meules, Quebec, in the Magdalen Islands. In May 1997, the Confederation Bridge opened, connecting Borden-Carleton to Cape Jourimain, New Brunswick. The world's longest bridge over ice-covered waters, it replaced the Marine Atlantic ferry service. Since then, the Confederation Bridge's assured transportation link to the mainland has altered the province's tourism and agricultural and fisheries export economies.

The Island has the highest concentration of roadways in Canada. The province has very strict laws regarding use of roadside signs. Billboards and the use of portable signs are banned. There are standard direction information signs on roads in the province for various businesses and attractions in the immediate area. The by-laws of some municipalities also restrict the types of permanent signs that may be installed on private property.

Several airlines service the Charlottetown Airport (CYYG); the Summerside Airport (CYSU) is an additional option for general aviation.

There is an extensive bicycling and hiking trail that spans the island. The Confederation Trail is a  recreational trail system. The land was once owned and used by Canadian National Railway (CN) as a rail line on the island.

Culture

Arts

The island's cultural traditions of art, music and creative writing are supported through the public education system. There is an annual arts festival, the Charlottetown Festival, hosted at the Confederation Centre of the Arts.

Lucy Maud Montgomery, who was born in Clifton (now New London) in 1874, drew inspiration from the land during the late Victorian Era for the setting of her classic novel Anne of Green Gables (1908). The musical play Anne of Green Gables has run every year at the Charlottetown festival for more than four decades. The sequel, Anne & Gilbert, premiered in the Playhouse in Victoria in 2005. The actual location of Green Gables, the house featured in Montgomery's Anne books, is in Cavendish, on the north shore of PEI.

Elmer Blaney Harris founded an artists colony at Fortune Bridge and set his famous play Johnny Belinda on the island. Robert Harris was a well-known artist.

Prince Edward Island's documented music history begins in the 19th century with religious music, some written by the local pump and block maker and organ-importer, Watson Duchemin. Several big bands including the Sons of Temperance Band and the Charlottetown Brass Band were active. Today, Acadian, Celtic, folk, and rock music prevail, with exponents including Gene MacLellan, his daughter Catherine MacLellan, Al Tuck, Lennie Gallant, Two Hours Traffic and Paper Lions. The celebrated singer-songwriter Stompin' Tom Connors spent his formative years in Skinners Pond. Celtic music is certainly the most common traditional music on the island, with fiddling and step dancing being very common. This tradition, largely Scottish, Irish and Acadian in origin is very similar to the music of Cape Breton and to a lesser extent, Newfoundland and is unique to the region. Due to the Islands influence as a former Highlander Clans Scottish colony, a March 4/4 for bagpipes was composed in honour of Prince Edward Island.

Festivals

There is an annual arts festival, the Charlottetown Festival, hosted at the Confederation Centre of the Arts as well as the Island Fringe Festival that takes place around Charlottetown. An annual jazz festival, the P.E.I. Jazz and Blues Festival. is a one-week-long series of concerts taking place at several venues including Murphy's Community Centre, outdoor stages, and churches in Charlottetown. The moving of its date to mid-August caused in 2011 a serious loss in funding from Ottawa's regional development agency ACOA. The musician's line up in 2011 included Oliver Jones, Sophie Milman, Matt Dusk, Jack de Keyzer, Jack Semple, Meaghan Smith and Jimmy Bowskill. There is also Canada Rocks, and the Cavendish Beach Music Festival. With agriculture and fishery playing a large role in the economy, P.E.I. has been marketed as a food tourism destination. Several food festivals have become popular such as the Fall Flavours festival and the Shellfish Festival.

Sports
The most common sports played on the Island are hockey, curling, golf, horse racing, baseball, soccer, rugby, football and basketball. Water sports are also popular on Prince Edward Island during the summer. 

The province is home to a major junior ice hockey team, the Charlottetown Islanders of the Quebec Major Junior Hockey League, and a Junior A ice hockey team, the Summerside Western Capitals, which play in the Maritime Junior A Hockey League. The Prince Edward Island Senators played in the American Hockey League from 1993 to 1996 and were affiliated with the Ottawa Senators. The PEI Senators eventually ended up in Binghamton, New York and became the Binghamton Senators in 2002.

The Island Storm were a professional basketball team that played in the National Basketball League of Canada. The team was founded in 2011 as the Summerside Storm for the league's inaugural season and became the Island Storm in 2013. The team was granted a one-year leave of absence in 2021 but have not returned since.

In 2008 and 2009, Prince Edward Island hosted the Tour de PEI, a province-wide cycling race consisting of women from around the world. 

Prince Edward Island has also hosted three Canada Games: two winter editions in 1991 and 2023; and a summer edition in 2009.

The two major indoor arenas in the province are: the Eastlink Centre (formerly the Civic Centre) in Charlottetown, home to the Charlottetown Islanders; and the Consolidated Credit Union Place in Summerside, home to the Summerside Western Capitals. The Credit Union Place was built to replace Cahill Stadium. 

The UPEI Panthers represent the University of Prince Edward Island in the Atlantic University Sport conference of U Sports. The Holland Hurricanes represent Holland College in the Atlantic Collegiate Athletic Association conference of the Canadian Collegiate Athletic Association.

Sister province
Hainan Province, China, has been the sister province of Prince Edward Island since 2001. This came about after Vice-Governor Lin Fanglue stayed for two days to hold discussions about partnership opportunities and trade.

See also

 Outline of Prince Edward Island
 Index of Canada-related articles
 List of people from Prince Edward Island

Notes

References

Further reading

 Also under 

 A very broad look at the historical geography of P.E.I.

External links

University of Prince Edward Island Digital Historical Archives

The Government Prince Edward Island Visitor's Guide
PEI info
Mi'kmaq Confederacy home page

 
1873 establishments in Canada
Atlantic Canada
British North America
Former British colonies and protectorates in the Americas
The Maritimes
States and territories established in 1873
Provinces and territories of Canada
Prince